A Collection of His Greatest Hits is a compilation album by the American recording artist Babyface, released in 2000.

Track listing

Charts

Weekly charts

Certifications

References

2000 greatest hits albums
Collection of His Greatest Hits